The Eighth Day may refer to:

Observances 
 Octave (liturgical)
 Shemini Atzeret, the eighth day of the Jewish Feast of Tabernacles
 The eighth day (Christian)

Film 
 Gattaca, a 1997 film with working title The Eighth Day
 On the 8th Day (1984 film), a documentary about nuclear winter
 The Eighth Day (1996 film), a Belgian film, directed by Jaco Van Dormael

Literature 
 The Eighth Day (novel), a 1967 novel by Thornton Wilder
 The Eighth Day (Westphal book), by Euler Renato Westphal

Music 
 8th Day (Jewish band), an American Hasidic pop rock band
 8th Day (R&B group), an American R&B group active in the 1970s
 "8th Day" (song), by Canadian country music artist Dean Brody
 "The Eighth Day" (The Damned song), a song by The Damned on their 1985 album Phantasmagoria
 "Eighth Day (Hazel O'Connor song)", a song by Hazel O'Connor from the album Breaking Glass
 The 8th Day (album), by American underground nerdcore rapper Raheem Jarbo
 "The Eighth Day", a song recorded by Screamin' Jay Hawkins

See also
Eighth Day Books, a bookstore in Wichita, Kansas
Octava Dies